The 1920 Hong Kong Sanitary Board election was held on 12 April 1920 for an elected seat in the Sanitary Board of Hong Kong.

The election was held for the two of the elected seats in the board due to the expiry of term of C. G. Alabaster. Alabaster returned to the Board by winning majority of 27 votes over architect J. Caer Clark, who was supported by the Kowloon Residents Association. With an electorate of about 1,700, less than 400 voted and 13 spoilt votes were recorded.

References

Hong Kong
1920 in Hong Kong
Sanitary
April 1920 events
1920 elections in the British Empire